Route 236 is a bypass road linking Port Rexton, Trinity Bay (situated on Route 230) with King's Cove and nearby towns on Bonavista Bay (situated on Route 235).  It runs north–south across between the two towns.

There are no other communities along this highway and no other highways intersect it.

Major intersections

Attractions along Route 236

Lockston Path Provincial Park

References

236